Chrostosoma destricta is a moth of the subfamily Arctiinae. It was described by Max Wilhelm Karl Draudt in 1915. It is found in Costa Rica.

References

BHL

Chrostosoma
Moths described in 1915